6O or 6-O can refer to:

6O, IATA code for Air Satellite
6-O-Methylguanine
6-O-methylnorlaudanosoline 5'-O-methyltransferase
6-O-arabinopyranosylglucopyranoside; see Vicianin 
6-O-Methylesculetin; see Scopoletin
6-O-palmitoylascorbic acid; see Ascorbyl palmitate 
6-O-(alpha-L-rhamnopyranosyl)-D-glucopyranose; see Rutinose  
6-O-Alpha-D-Glucopyranosyl-D-Fructofuranose; see Isomaltulose 
6-O-sulfation, a phenomenon occurring in Heparan sulfate

See also
O6 (disambiguation)